The fourth USS Niagara (SP-246) was a motor boat that served in the United States Navy during World War I.

Niagara was built by Matthews Boat Company at Port Clinton, Ohio, in 1913. She was acquired by the U.S. Navy on lease from Lawrence D. Buhl of Detroit, Michigan, on 9 June 1917 for service in World War I, and was commissioned the same day.

Niagara served as a motor patrol boat in the 9th Naval District until returned to her owner on 20 March 1919.

References

External links
 Photo gallery at navsource.org

World War I patrol vessels of the United States
Patrol vessels of the United States Navy
Ships built in Port Clinton, Ohio
1913 ships